In 1956, Israeli Chief of Staff Moshe Dayan gave a eulogy for a Roi Rotberg, a kibbutz security officer killed near the Gaza Strip, calling upon Israel to search its soul and probe the national mindset. Dayan's eulogy is considered one of the most influential speeches in Israeli history, and has the importance in Israeli collective memory that the Gettysburg Address has in American memory.

Background
Nahal Oz became a kibbutz in 1953 and was frequently in conflict with Arabs who crossed the nearby armistice line from Gaza to reap crops and conduct petty theft. 
The previous few months had been relatively quiet on the Israel's borders with Egypt and Gaza, but escalated with several cross-border shootings in early April.  On April 4, three Israeli soldiers were killed by Egyptian forces on the Gaza border. Israel responded the next day by shelling the center of Gaza City, killing 58 Egyptian and Palestinian civilians as well as 4 Egyptian soldiers. Egypt responded by resuming fedayeen attacks across the border, killing 14 Israelis during the period 11–17 April.

Roi Rotberg was born in Tel Aviv in 1935. He served as a messenger boy for the Israel Defense Forces during the 1948 Arab-Israeli War. After studying at the Mikveh Israel agricultural school and the Shevah Mofet vocational school, he enlisted in the IDF and joined the infantry. After completing an officer's course, he settled in Nahal Oz, which was to be the first of the Nahal settlements. He became the Nahal Oz security officer, and was regularly involved in chasing off infiltrators, sometimes using lethal force. Rotberg married Amira Glickson and had a son, Boaz, who was an infant at the time of his death.

On 29 April 1956 he was caught in a prepared ambush; Arab harvest workers began to reap wheat in the kibbutz's fields. After Rotberg saw them, he rode toward them to chase them off. As he approached, others emerged from hiding to attack. He was shot off his horse, beaten and shot again, then his body was dragged into Gaza. Rotberg's attackers included an Egyptian policeman and a Palestinian farmer. Badly mutilated, his body was returned on the same day after United Nations intervention.

Six months after his death, the Suez Crisis began with an Israeli invasion of the Gaza Strip and Sinai. After occupying the Gaza Strip, two suspects in Rotberg's murder, police sergeant Jamil Awad al-Qasim al-Wadih and farmer Mahmoud Mohammed Yousef al-Maziar, were arrested and brought to Israel for trial. In January 1959, they were convicted of Rotberg's murder and sentenced to life imprisonment. Their appeal to the Supreme Court of Israel was rejected in May 1960.

The eulogy

According to Jean-Pierre Filiu, following the killing, emotions in Israel "ran high", leading Dayan to travel to the kibbutz to give the funeral oration.

"Early yesterday morning Roi was murdered. The quiet of the spring morning dazzled him and he did not see those waiting in ambush for him, at the edge of the furrow. Let us not cast the blame on the murderers today. Why should we declare their burning hatred for us? For eight years they have been sitting in the refugee camps in Gaza, and before their eyes we have been transforming the lands and the villages, where they and their fathers dwelt, into our estate. It is not among the Arabs in Gaza, but in our own midst that we must seek Roi's blood. How did we shut our eyes and refuse to look squarely at our fate, and see, in all its brutality, the destiny of our generation? Have we forgotten that this group of young people dwelling at Nahal Oz is bearing the heavy gates of Gaza on its shoulders? Beyond the furrow of the border, a sea of hatred and desire for revenge is swelling, awaiting the day when serenity will dull our path, for the day when we will heed the ambassadors of malevolent hypocrisy who call upon us to lay down our arms. Roi's blood is crying out to us and only to us from his torn body. Although we have sworn a thousandfold that our blood shall not flow in vain, yesterday again we were tempted, we listened, we believed.
We will make our reckoning with ourselves today; we are a generation that settles the land and without the steel helmet and the cannon's maw, we will not be able to plant a tree and build a home. Let us not be deterred from seeing the loathing that is inflaming and filling the lives of the hundreds of thousands of Arabs who live around us. Let us not avert our eyes lest our arms weaken. This is the fate of our generation. This is our life's choice - to be prepared and armed, strong and determined, lest the sword be stricken from our fist and our lives cut down. The young Roi who left Tel Aviv to build his home at the gates of Gaza to be a wall for us was blinded by the light in his heart and he did not see the flash of the sword. The yearning for peace deafened his ears and he did not hear the voice of murder waiting in ambush. The gates of Gaza weighed too heavily on his shoulders and overcame him."

References

1956 in Israel
Rotberg, Roi
Palestinian Fedayeen insurgency